Plateau Valley may refer to:
Plateau Valley (Colorado)
Plateau Valley (Utah)